Events in the year 1961 in the Republic of India.

Incumbents
 President of India – Rajendra Prasad
 Prime Minister of India – Jawaharlal Nehru
 Vice President of India – Sarvepalli Radhakrishnan
 Chief Justice of India – Bhuvaneshwar Prasad Sinha

Governors
 Andhra Pradesh – Bhim Sen Sachar 
 Assam – Vishnu Sahay (until 13 January), Satyavant Mallannah Shrinagesh (starting 13 January)
 Bihar – Zakir Hussain 
 Gujarat – Mehdi Nawaz Jung
 Karnataka – Jayachamarajendra Wadiyar 
 Kerala – V. V. Giri 
 Madhya Pradesh – Hari Vinayak Pataskar
 Maharashtra – Sri Prakasa
 Odisha – Yeshwant Narayan Sukthankar 
 Punjab – Narahar Vishnu Gadgil 
 Rajasthan – Gurumukh Nihal Singh 
 Uttar Pradesh – Burgula Ramakrishna Rao 
 West Bengal – Padmaja Naidu

Events
 National income - 186,821 million
 20 January – Queen Elizabeth II start of Royal visit
 4 March – the first Aircraft carrier of Indian Navy,  was commissioned.
 19 April -  Indian Foreign Service officer K. Sankara Pillai assassinated at Indian High Commission, Ottawa by a youth of Yugoslavian origins. This is the first martyr-ship of an Indian Diplomat.
 29 May – Nearly 32 people died in a coastal village in Kollam, Kerala due to chelonitoxism after consuming Turtle meat.
 12 July – Panshet Dam bursts in Pune causing a massive flood in the city of Pune. Over 1,000 people die.
 2 October - Shipping Corporation of India is incorporated by amalgamation of Eastern Shipping Corporation and Western Shipping Corporation.
 1 November – The Hungry generation movement is launched in Calcutta.
 17-19 December – Goa is officially ceded to India after 400 years of Portuguese rule.
23 June - Sainik School system was established by Defence Minister of India, V. K. Krishna Menon.

Law

 5 December – Supreme Court of India held that land taking under Kerala Agrarian Relations Act, 1961 is not protected from judicial scrutiny of Article 31(A).

 The Tenth and Eleventh Amendments of the Constitution of India (1961)
 Anti-dowry Act

Births
7 January – Supriya Pathak, actress.
12 June – Jagadish, actor.
6 July – Vandana Chavan, politician and lawyer.
15 August  Suhasini Maniratnam, actress, producer and director.
19 November  Vivek, actor and comedian. (d. 2021).

Full date unknown
V. M. Girija, poet.

See also 
 List of Bollywood films of 1961

References

 
India
Years of the 20th century in India
1960s in India